The Texas Freedom Network (TFN) is a Texas organization which describes its goals as protecting religious freedom, defending civil liberties, and strengthening public schools in the state. It works to counter the activities of the Christian right. Founded in 1996 by Cecile Richards, the daughter of former Governor Ann W. Richards. the group had 19,000 members by 2004.

Leadership and direction
Under Richards, the organization focused mainly on education, but under the leadership of Samantha Smoot (1998–2004) it broadened its focus to include hate crimes and gay rights. As of February 2009, Kathy Miller is the president.

The TFN has opposed the attempts of Don McLeroy and other religious conservatives on the Texas State Board of Education to mandate that Texas high schools offer Bible classes and change history textbook standards, arguing that many of the proposed changes violate religious freedom and the separation of church and state. TFN has also closely followed the activities of the Board of Education and activists on other education issues, such as the teaching of evolution in public schools.

Bible study curricula
In 2005 TFN criticized the National Council on Bible Curriculum in Public Schools curriculum for promoting a fundamentalist Christian view and violating religious freedom. It commissioned a report by Southern Methodist University biblical scholar Mark A. Chancey, which found:

Evolution curricula

In a survey commissioned by TFN, "94% of Texas scientists indicated that claimed 'weaknesses' of evolution are not valid scientific objections to evolution (with 87% saying that they 'strongly disagree' that such weaknesses should be considered valid)."

Other issues
In February 2009 a TFN-funded study conducted by two Texas State University researchers, titled Just Say Don't Know: Sexuality Education in Texas Public Schools found that in many cases, students are given misleading and inaccurate information about the risks associated with sex.

References

External links
Texas Freedom Network- Official

Public education in Texas
Politics of Texas
Civil liberties advocacy groups in the United States
Organizations established in 1996
Organizations based in Texas
501(c)(4) nonprofit organizations